Albert Enoch Pillsbury (August 19, 1849 – December 23, 1930) was a Boston lawyer who served in both houses of the Massachusetts legislature, president of the Massachusetts State Senate, and as the Attorney General of Massachusetts from 1891 to 1894.  In addition to being a member of the National Negro Committee, the precursor to the NAACP, Pillsbury was a member of the Boston Committee to Advance the Cause of the Negro, which in 1911 became a branch of the NAACP.  It was Pillsbury who drafted the bylaws of the NAACP.  In 1913, he resigned his membership in the American Bar Association when that organization rejected the membership of William H. Lewis, a black assistant U.S. attorney and supporter of Booker T. Washington. In 1913, Pillsbury was awarded an honorary LL.D. degree from Howard University. It was there he delivered his speech illuminating, defending and praising President Lincoln's role in ending slavery that became a small book, Lincoln and Slavery.

1917 Massachusetts Constitutional Convention
In 1916 the Massachusetts legislature and electorate approved a calling of a Constitutional Convention.  In May 1917 Pillsbury was elected to serve as a member of the Massachusetts Constitutional Convention of 1917, representing the Ninth Norfolk District of the Massachusetts House of Representatives.

He was the nephew of abolitionist Parker Pillsbury.

See also
 1876 Massachusetts legislature
 1877 Massachusetts legislature
 1878 Massachusetts legislature
 1885 Massachusetts legislature
 1886 Massachusetts legislature

References
 See Footnote 1 to letter dated "25 Feb 1900" from A. E. Pillsbury to Booker T. Washington.  The Booker T. Washington Papers, Vol. 5: 1899-1900, pp.449-450, University of Illinois Press.

Footnotes

External links

1849 births
1930 deaths
People from Milford, New Hampshire
Republican Party Massachusetts state senators
Republican Party members of the Massachusetts House of Representatives
Members of the 1917 Massachusetts Constitutional Convention
Massachusetts Attorneys General
Massachusetts lawyers
Harvard College alumni